Nicholas More (died 1689) was first chief justice of the Province of Pennsylvania.

Early life 
More (also spelled "Moore" or "Moor") was born in England, where he also married his wife Mary. More immigrated to the American Thirteen Colonies with William Penn in 1682 and lived in the colony of Pennsylvania, but little is known of More prior to this. It is known that More was trained in London as a medical physician, but he did not engage in that profession after immigration. Soon after settling in Society Hill, Philadelphia, he set up "The Free Society of Traders" and became its president. More with other English merchants obtained a parcel of land consisting of just under ten thousand (9,815) acres from Penn for the society in 1684, which became known as the Manor of Moreland. Part of the land was in  Philadelphia County and part was in Montgomery County, Pennsylvania. More had a town house at the corner of Second Street and Spruce Street in Philadelphia. In addition he had a country house at Green Spring, near Somerton, Philadelphia.

Mid-life 
More, according to tradition, became the president or speaker of the first provincial assembly of freemen of Pennsylvania. It initially assembled on 4 December 1682 at Chester, Pennsylvania. He was secretary and clerk to the provincial council in 1683. and became a member of the assembly in 1684-85. More was the presiding judge of Philadelphia county courts in 1683-84. He claimed he was an attorney in London, so Penn appointed him to become the first chief justice of the supreme court of the province of Pennsylvania in 1684. Because of his arrogant and contentious demeanor he was impeached on 15 May 1685 for "high crimes and misdemeanors", being charged with abusing his powers. He had ten charges brought against him. This was the first case in America of an impeachment of a judge.

A letter containing the impeachment was forwarded to Penn, who meanwhile had gone to England. He did not give More's impeachment his official approval. Penn was still confident of More's abilities and nominated him in 1686 as one of the five commissioners for the executive branch of the Pennsylvania government. More was later given back his position as chief justice of the colony of Pennsylvania and his job as judge. More made a jail at his country home grounds at Green Spring and developed a court for hearing cases for prisoners.

Later life and death 
Even though More was elected a member of the board of five commissioners for the executive government he was unable to serve the position because of his poor health. He died in Philadelphia in 1689. He was survived by his wife and four children.

References

Bibliography 

 
 
 
 
 

Date of birth unknown
1689 deaths
Politicians from London
Members of the Pennsylvania Provincial Assembly
Pennsylvania lawyers
Impeached judges removed from office
English emigrants
People of colonial Pennsylvania
Officials impeached by the Thirteen Colonies